Joana Heidrich (born 2 October 1991) is a Swiss beach volleyball player. She played with Nadine Zumkehr in the 2016 Summer Olympics in Rio de Janeiro.

Following Zumkehr's retirement at the close of the 2016 season, Heidrich partnered with Anouk Vergé-Dépré, whose own former partner, Isabelle Forrer, likewise retired.

In July 2021, the pair again joined forces to represent Switzerland at the 2020 Summer Olympics in Tokyo that had been delayed due to the worldwide Covid-19 pandemic.

Professional career
The pair participated in the 2016 summer Olympics in Rio with a 14th seed, as of 12 June 2016, placement. They lost against Brazil's #1 seed team of Talita Antunes and Larissa Franca in a nail biting match of 3 sets (21–23, 27–25, 15–13),which was also the longest match at Rio, in the quarter final Played 14 August 2016.

World tour 2016
She competed at the World Tour finals in Toronto.
The pair played against fellow country mates of  Isabelle Forrer and Anouk Verge-Depre and won in 3 sets of (14–21, 21–15, 15–10).
The pair advanced to Gold medal match against Germany's Olympic Gold medalists of Laura Ludwig and Kira Walkenhorst. They lost to the German's in straight sets of (18–21, 16–21) and finished with the Silver medal.

References

External links
 
 
 
 
 Joana Heidrich at Swiss Team Heidrich / Verge-Depre

1991 births
Living people
Swiss beach volleyball players
Women's beach volleyball players
Beach volleyball players at the 2016 Summer Olympics
Olympic beach volleyball players of Switzerland
FIVB World Tour award winners
Beach volleyball players at the 2020 Summer Olympics
Olympic bronze medalists for Switzerland
Medalists at the 2020 Summer Olympics
Olympic medalists in beach volleyball